The Detour River is a tributary of the Turgeon River, which flows in Canada through the administrative regions of:
Northeastern Ontario, in Cochrane District;
Nord-du-Québec, in the municipality of Eeyou Istchee Baie-James (municipality), in the administrative region of Nord-du-Québec, in Québec.

Geography 
The hydrographic slopes adjacent to the Detour River are:
North side: Lawagamau River (Ontario), Malouin River (Quebec);
East side: Turgeon River (Quebec);
Southern side: Chabbie River (Ontario), Little Turcotte River (Ontario), Turgeon River (Quebec and Ontario);
West side: Lawagamau River (Ontario).

The Detour River originates in Northeastern Ontario, at the mouth of the "Upper Lake Detour" (length: ,), southeast of the lake Lawagamau, east of the Chabbie River and north of "North Chabbie Lake". The "Upper Detour Lake" has three parts bounded by peninsulas. Its mouth is situated on the eastern shore of the northern part of the lake.

River course in Northeastern Ontario

From "Upper Detour Lake", the Detour River flows:
 to the north by collecting the waters of six streams;
 to the east, to a stream from the south;
 to the north;
 to east to Monaghan Lake landfill (length: ,);
 to northeast, along the eastern shore of Detour Lake where the river will be discharged at the tip of a point the northeast shore, in the marsh area. This lake receives the waters of five surrounding lakes, through four landfills. Then the current branches off towards the east where the river resumes its course;
 southeast to the west shore of Lower Detour Lake (). This lake receives from the north the waters of Stake Lake and two lakes to the south;
 to the east, then to the south, through marsh areas, to the Quebec border.

Course of the river in Northeast of Quebec

From the Quebec - Ontario border, the Detour River flows  eastward to the Turgeon River. In this segment of Quebec, the Detour River collects the waters of:
 "Sunday Creek" (Ontario) from the north, draining the waters of several Ontario lakes including Kitchin Lake (elevation ), Sunday Lake (elevation ) et Auger Lake in Quebec;
 the discharge of Lac Geoffrion ( long,), which drains upstream the waters of the Quebec lakes Grady (altitude: , Lavoie and Carrier. The upper part of this branch drains wetlands in Ontario;
 unloading of an unnamed lake (from the north).

Toponymy 
The following place names are interrelated: Upper Detour Lake, Little Detour Lake, Detour Lake, Lower Detour Lake and Detour River.

The place name Detour River (or "rivière de Détour", in French) was officially registered on December 5, 1968, at the Bank of Place Names of the Commission de toponymie du Québec.

See also

References

External links 

Rivers of Nord-du-Québec
Rivers of Cochrane District